Hpa-an (also spelled Pa-an) is the capital and largest city of Kayin State (Karen State), Myanmar (Burma). The population of Hpa-an as of the 2014 census was 421,575. Most of the people in Hpa-an are of the Karen ethnic group.

Legend

Legend has it that Hpa-An was created by the dragon king and the frog king. King Mandu (မဏ္ဍုဖားမင်းကြီး), a giant frog lived the top of the Mount Hpan Pu. One day, while out searching for food, he saw a large magic ruby with an emerald club placed on the throne in the foot cave of Mount Hpan Pu, and the frog king thought the ruby was his food and swallowed it. He gained powers by swallowing the magic ruby and was able to resist his enemy, the dragon king. The place where the dragon king vomited the frog king is called Hpa-An (lit. 'vomit frog'). The impressive statues of these figures can be seen in the Shwe Yin Myaw Pagoda's compound.

Climate
Hpa-An has a tropical monsoon climate (Köppen climate classification Am). Temperatures are very warm throughout the year, although maximum temperatures are somewhat depressed in the monsoon season due to heavy cloud and rain. There is a winter dry season (November–April) and a summer wet season (May–October). Torrential rain falls from June to September, with over  falling in July and August alone.

Transport 

Air

Hpa-An was linked to Yangon, Mawlamyine and Hpapun by air but the airport ceased operations.

Buses

There are express buses from Hpa-An to Yangon, Mawlamyine, the border crossing at Myawaddy and other towns.

Population history
 1953: 4,100
 1983: 41,500
2014: 421,525

Education
 Computer University, Hpa-An
 Hpa-An Education College
 Hpa-An Nursing Training School
 Hpa-An University
 Technological University, Hpa-An

Religion

The majority of residents are Theravada Buddhists, followed by Baptist, Anglican and Roman Catholics.

Sights

Kayin State Cultural Museum is located in Hpa-An. Mount Zwegabin and Mount Taung Wine are attractive places for visitors, as well as Kyauk Ka Lat Pagoda in which the sacred hair relic of Buddha is enshrined. Hpa An is famous for many limestone caves, like
Bayin Nyi Naung Cave,
Yathae Byan Cave, 
Kawgon Cave (or Kawgoon Cave), 
Kaw-ka-thaung Cave and
Saddan Cave
Linno Cave

Such caves are well worth visiting because of their incredibly beautiful landscapes and ancient Buddha images and other cultural items in them which were once less known due to regional instability.
The Shwe Yin Myaw Pagoda and Thit Hta Man Aung Pagoda are in the center of Hpa-an. Enjoying the beauty of Than Lwin River from the platform of the pagoda is an opportunity that should not be missed. Other interesting places are Kyone Htaw Waterfall which is 2 hours driving from Hpa-an, and the Saddan Cave (mentioned above) which is the biggest and longest cave in Kayin State. The beautiful Kan Thar Yar Lake and its bridge are the heart of Kayin State.

Health care
 Hpa-An General Hospital
 Taung Kalay Military Hospital

Sports

Football 
Zwegabin United FC founded in 2010, is based in Hpa-An. The club is competing in Myanmar National League.

Trekking and hiking 

Mount Zwegabin is around 8.5 km south of Hpa An. It is visited by tourists for its views and natural environment.

At Bayint Nyi cave (literally: "King's Younger Brother cave"), a climbing site developed with support from The Technical Climbing Club of Myanmar (TCCM) and a number of expats in Yangon who belong to Myanmar Rock Community (MRC), is an ongoing project having started in 2015. The club is now beginning to attract interest from local people which is helping fuel a growing interest in the sport of rock climbing around Myanmar.

References

External links

Township capitals of Myanmar
Populated places in Kayin State